Sanasar Oganisyan (born 5 February 1960) is a former Soviet Armenian Freestyle wrestler and Olympic, World and European Champion. He became an Honoured Master of Sports of the USSR in 1980.

Early life
Oganisyan was born on February 5, 1960, in Moscow, Russian SFSR. He graduated from the Moscow Engineering and Construction Institute. As an espoir he became a European Champion in 1978 and as a junior a World Champion in 1979. Oganisyan played for the Spartak Moscow wrestling club.

Career
At the age of 20, Oganisyan was selected by the Soviet Olympic team to compete at the 1980 Summer Olympics. Oganisyan won an Olympic gold medal. He became the first Armenian freestyle wrestler and the second Armenian wrestler to become an Olympic Champion.

Oganisyan won a gold medal at the 1981 World Wrestling Championships and 1981 Wrestling World Cup the following year. However, he also received a serious back injury in 1982 and had to take some time off. It took almost two years for Oganisyan is recover, after which he qualified for the 1984 Soviet Olympic team but missed the Olympics due to the Soviet boycott. Instead he competed in wrestling at the Friendship Games and won gold as light-heavyweight, and later won the World Cup that year as well.

He won a gold medal at the 1986 European Wrestling Championships, but then re-injured his back and again missed several seasons. After recovering, Oganisyan made another comeback attempt, now as a heavyweight, but with less success, not qualifying for the 1988 Soviet Olympic team, although he did win silver at the 1989 World Cup. Oganisyan won his second USSR Championship in 1989 and retired after the fall of the Soviet Union.

Personal life
Sanasar's younger brother is Gor Chahal, a famous artist.

References

External links

1956 births
Living people
Soviet male sport wrestlers
Armenian male sport wrestlers
Honoured Masters of Sport of the USSR
Olympic wrestlers of the Soviet Union
Wrestlers at the 1980 Summer Olympics
Olympic gold medalists for the Soviet Union
Olympic medalists in wrestling
Medalists at the 1980 Summer Olympics
World Wrestling Championships medalists
Soviet Armenians
European Wrestling Championships medalists